Chicago Air Route Traffic Control Center (ZAU) (radio communications: "Chicago Center") is one of 22 Air Route Traffic Control Centers (ARTCCs) operated by the United States Federal Aviation Administration. It is located at 619 W. New Indian Trail Rd., Aurora, Illinois.

The primary responsibility of Chicago Center is sequencing and separation of over-flights, arrivals, and departures in order to provide safe, orderly, and expeditious flow of aircraft.

Chicago Center lies adjacent to Minneapolis Air Route Traffic Control Center, Kansas City Air Route Traffic Control Center, Indianapolis Air Route Traffic Control Center, and Cleveland Air Route Traffic Control Center. ZAU overlies or abuts many approach control facilities (including Chicago, Milwaukee, Madison, Cedar Rapids, Des Moines, the Quad Cities, Peoria, Springfield, Indianapolis, and Grand Rapids approaches).

Chicago Center is the fifth-busiest ARTCC in the United States. Between January 1, 2012, and December 31, 2012, Chicago Center handled 2,343,281 aircraft operations.

2014 fire 

On September 26, 2014, an arson at the Chicago Center (ZAU) facility caused operations across ZAU-controlled airspace to be suspended, including airport operations at Chicago's O'Hare and Midway International Airports, resulting in canceled flights. One employee at the facility was treated for smoke inhalation, while remaining employees were evacuated.

Brian Howard, who had been working for the FAA as a contract employee of Harris Corporation, was charged with one count of "destruction of aircraft or aircraft facilities" following the incident.

References

External links
Chicago Air Route Traffic Control Center (FAA)
Chicago Center Weather Service Unit (NWS)

Air traffic control
Air traffic control centers
WAAS reference stations
Transportation in Chicago
Aviation in Illinois
Aurora, Illinois